Greg Hames (born 3 May 1980) was an English cricketer. He was a right-handed batsman and a right-arm medium-pace bowler who played for Buckinghamshire. He was born in Reading.

Hames, who played for Buckinghamshire in the Minor Counties Championship between 1998 and 2000, made a single List A appearance for the side, during the 1999 season, against Yorkshire Cricket Board. From the opening order, he scored 16 runs.

References

External links
Greg Hames at Cricket Archive

1980 births
Living people
English cricketers
Buckinghamshire cricketers